ARM Benito Juárez (POLA-101) is the lead ship of Reformador-class frigate of the Mexican Navy. Previously was named as ARM Reformador until March 2020, the ship is officially classified as "long-range ocean patrol ship".

Design and description 
The ship has a complement of 122 personnel.

The ship are armed with one Bofors 57 mm Naval Automatic Gun L/70 Mark 3, two 25 mm Rafael Typhoon Mk 38 Mod 2 remote-controlled weapon stations, and six 12.7 mm (.50 cal) M2 Browning. For surface warfare, Reformador are equipped with four RGM-84L Harpoon Block II anti-ship missile launchers, one RIM-116 Rolling Airframe Missile anti-aircraft missile launcher, and eight RIM-162 ESSM vertical launching system cells. For anti-submarine warfare, she is equipped with two three-tube Mark 32 torpedo tubes for Mark 54 torpedo.

Her sensors and electronic systems consisted of Thales SMART-S Mk2 air/surface surveillance radar, Raytheon Anschütz Synapsis navigation radar, one Thales Captas-2 towed sonar, Thales TACTICOS combat management system and ERA Indra Rigel electronic warfare suite.

Reformador also has a hangar and flight deck for helicopter. She can accommodate a MH-60R Seahawk anti-submarine helicopter, though in practice she usually carried an AS565 Panther helicopter.

Construction and career 
The ship was laid down on 17 August 2017 at Damen Schelde Naval Shipbuilding in Vlissingen, the Netherlands. Similar to the Indonesian s built previously, the ship are built from six modules or sections. Two modules were built by Damen Naval in Vlissingen, with another four modules built at Astillero de Marina Número 20 (ASTIMAR 20) in Mexico, which also assembled the modules and finished the ship. The two modules built in the Netherlands were transported to the Mexican shipyard for assembly.

The frigate was launched and officially named as ARM Reformador (POLA-101) on 23 November 2018 in a ceremony at ASTIMAR 20 in Salina Cruz, Oaxaca, coinciding with the Mexican Navy Day. The ceremony was attended by the then-President Enrique Peña Nieto. Reformador was the first large warship to be built in Mexico in more than 80 years.

The ship completed sea trials in December 2019. Reformador was handed over to the Mexican Navy and commissioned on 6 February 2020 in a ceremony at ASTIMAR 20 in Salina Cruz. The frigate was renamed to ARM Benito Juárez in March 2020, ordered by President Andrés Manuel López Obrador.

References

External links

Video of Long Range Ocean Patrol Vessel (POLA) ARM Reformador from construction to sea trials by Damen

2018 ships
Ships built in Vlissingen
Ships built in Mexico
Frigates of the Mexican Navy